The following radio stations broadcast on FM frequency 88.4 MHz:

China 
 CNR The Voice of China in Deyang, Xuzhou and Zhuzhou
 CNR Business Radio in Wuzhong
 CRI News Radio in Yantai (stopped airing in August 2017)

Indonesia
 Global Radio in Jakarta

United Kingdom
 BBC Radio 2 in Calder Valley, Campbeltown, Carmarthenshire, Colwyn Bay, Folkestone, Hebden Bridge, Isle of Man, Kenley, Peebles, Pontypridd, South Wales, West Yorkshire
 Gaydio in Manchester

References

Lists of radio stations by frequency

id:Global Radio